Chippewa Moraine State Recreation Area is a state park unit of Wisconsin, USA, preserving numerous glacial landforms. The abundance and quality of these geological features led to its being included in the Ice Age National Scientific Reserve.  The Ice Age National Scenic Trail passes through the park.  The park is largely undeveloped, but its modern visitor center serves to interpret the area's geological and biological features.  Official documentation alternatively refers to the park as the Chippewa Moraine Ice Age Reserve or the Chippewa Moraine Ice Age National Scientific Reserve. It is located in northwestern Chippewa County.

The Chippewa Moraine Interpretive Center offers exhibits about the area's geology, natural history, and cultural history, as well as naturalist-led programs for school groups.

External links
Chippewa Moraine State Recreation Area Wisconsin Department of Natural Resources

State parks of Wisconsin
Ice Age National Scientific Reserve
Nature centers in Wisconsin
Protected areas established in 1971
Protected areas of Chippewa County, Wisconsin
1971 establishments in Wisconsin